Polydore Jules Léon Veirman (23 February 1881 – 1951) was a Belgian rower who won two Olympic silver medals: in 1908 in the coxed eight, and in 1912 in the single scull. Between 1901 and 1912 Veirman won four gold and three silver medals in various events at European championships. He was assured another medal at the 1913 European Rowing Championships as of the four single scull finalists, Giuseppe Sinigaglia and Anatol Peresselenzeff were disqualified. Competing against only one other rower, Veirman capsized and Friedrich Graf was the only one to reach the finish line.

References

1881 births
Belgian male rowers
Olympic rowers of Belgium
Olympic silver medalists for Belgium
Rowers at the 1908 Summer Olympics
Rowers at the 1912 Summer Olympics
Flemish sportspeople
1951 deaths
Olympic medalists in rowing
Medalists at the 1912 Summer Olympics
Medalists at the 1908 Summer Olympics
Rowers from Ghent
European Rowing Championships medalists